Kinkaid may refer to
Kinkaid (surname)
USS Kinkaid, a Spruance-class U.S. Navy destroyer
Kinkaid Act of 1904, which applied to Western Nebraska, U.S.
Kinkaid Formation, a geological formation in Illinois, U.S.
Kinkaid Lake in Illinois
Kinkaid Lake State Fish and Wildlife Area in Illinois
Kinkaid Township, Jackson County, Illinois
Kinkaid, Nevada, a populated place in the United States
The Kinkaid School in Texas, U.S.

See also
Kincaid (disambiguation)